Farewell Point is a point which forms the northeast extremity of Bird Island, off the west end of South Georgia. The name appears to have been applied by Discovery Investigations personnel who charted South Georgia in the period 1926–30.

References 

Headlands of South Georgia and the South Sandwich Islands